The 2011 Dublin Senior Hurling Championship is a Dublin based GAA club competition between the top clubs in Dublin Hurling.

Round robin

Group A

Group B

Revised Championship
Due to the success of the Dublin Senior Hurling County team, the format of the tournament was changed to suit the limited timetable leading up to the Leinster Club championship.

First round

Quarter-finals

Semi-finals

Dublin Senior Club Hurling final

References

Dublin Senior Hurling Championship
Dublin Senior Hurling Championship